The Very Best of Ray Stevens is a collection of 12 previously released singles that were hits for novelty/country artist, Ray Stevens; it was released in December 1975 by Barnaby Records. While this collection has more emphasis on Stevens' hits for Barnaby, it also contains three from the label of Monument Records ("Unwind," "Mr. Businessman," and "Gitarzan") and two from Mercury Records (Stevens' first label). The version of "Mr. Businessman" is the single release. "Gitarzan" is the album version that begins with an audience cheering and applauding. "Ahab the Arab" is the original recording that was released by Mercury (Stevens had re-recorded the song for his album Gitarzan in 1969).

Track listing

Album credits
All tunes except for the eighth and twelfth tracks were arranged and produced by Ray Stevens for AHAB Productions, Inc.
"Jeremiah Peabody" and "Ahab the Arab" were produced by Shelby Singleton
Barnaby Records is distributed by Janus Records, a Division of GRT Corporation
Album sequencing: Ed DeJoy
Album Coordination: Allan Mason and Terry Droltz

Charts

References

1975 compilation albums
Ray Stevens compilation albums
Barnaby Records albums